The clathrate gun hypothesis is a proposed explanation for the periods of rapid warming during the Quaternary. The idea is that changes in fluxes in upper intermediate waters in the ocean caused temperature fluctuations that alternately accumulated and occasionally released methane clathrate on upper continental slopes. This would have had an immediate impact on the global temperature, as methane is a much more powerful greenhouse gas than carbon dioxide. Despite its atmospheric lifetime of around 12 years, methane's global warming potential is 72 times greater than that of carbon dioxide over 20 years, and 25 times over 100 years (33 when accounting for aerosol interactions).These warming events would have caused the Bond Cycles and individual interstadial events, such as the Dansgaard–Oeschger interstadials.

The hypothesis was supported for the Bølling-Allerød and Preboreal period, but not for Dansgaard–Oeschger interstadials, although there are still debates on the topic. While it may be important on the millennial timescales, it is no longer considered relevant for the near future climate change: the IPCC Sixth Assessment Report states "It is very unlikely that gas clathrates (mostly methane) in deeper terrestrial permafrost and subsea clathrates will lead to a detectable departure from the emissions trajectory during this century".

Mechanism

Methane clathrate, also known commonly as methane hydrate, is a form of water ice that contains a large amount of methane within its crystal structure. Potentially large deposits of methane clathrate have been found under sediments on the ocean floors of the Earth, although the estimates of total resource size given by various experts differ by many orders of magnitude, leaving doubt as to the size of methane clathrate deposits (particularly in the viability of extracting them as a fuel resource). Indeed, cores of greater than 10 centimeters' contiguous depth had only been found in three sites as of 2000, and some resource reserve size estimates for specific deposits/locations have been based primarily on seismology. The sudden release of large amounts of natural gas from methane clathrate deposits in runaway climate change could be a cause of past, future, and present climate changes. 

In the Arctic ocean, clathrates can exist in shallower water stabilized by lower temperatures rather than higher pressures; these may potentially be marginally stable much closer to the surface of the sea-bed, stabilized by a frozen 'lid' of permafrost preventing methane escape. The so-called self-preservation phenomenon has been studied by Russian geologists starting in the late 1980s. This metastable clathrate state can be a basis for release events of methane excursions, such as during the interval of the Last Glacial Maximum. A study from 2010 concluded with the possibility for a trigger of abrupt climate warming based on metastable methane clathrates in the East Siberian Arctic Shelf (ESAS) region.

Possible past releases

Studies published in 2000 considered this hypothetical effect to be responsible for warming events in and at the end of the Last Glacial Maximum,. Although periods of increased atmospheric methane match periods of continental-slope failure., later work found that the distinct deuterium/hydrogen (D/H) isotope ratio indicated wetland methane emissions as the main contributor to atmospheric methane concentrations. While there were major dissociation events during the last deglaciation, with Bølling-Allerød warming triggering the disappearance of the entire methane hydrate deposit in the Barents Sea within 5000 years, those events failed to counteract the onset of a major Younger Dryas cooling period, suggesting that most of the methane stayed within the seawater after being liberated from the seafloor deposits, with very little entering the atmosphere.

In 2008, it was suggested that equatorial permafrost methane clathrate may have had a role in the sudden warm-up of "Snowball Earth", 630 million years ago. 

Other events potentially linked to methane hydrate excursions are the Permian–Triassic extinction event and the Paleocene–Eocene Thermal Maximum.

Paleocene–Eocene Thermal Maximum

Permian–Triassic extinction event

Global warming feedback

Modern deposits 
Most deposits of methane clathrate are in sediments too deep to respond rapidly, and 2007 modelling by Archer suggests that the methane forcing derived from them should remain a minor component of the overall greenhouse effect.  Clathrate deposits destabilize from the deepest part of their stability zone, which is typically hundreds of metres below the seabed.  A sustained increase in sea temperature will warm its way through the sediment eventually, and cause the shallowest, most marginal clathrate to start to break down; but it will typically take on the order of a thousand years or more for the temperature signal to get through. 

However, some methane clathrates deposits in the Arctic are much shallower than the rest, which could make them far more vulnerable to warming. A trapped gas deposit on the continental slope off Canada in the Beaufort Sea, located in an area of small conical hills on the ocean floor is just 290 meters below sea level and considered the shallowest known deposit of methane hydrate. However, the East Siberian Arctic Shelf averages 45 meters in depth, and it is assumed that below the seafloor, sealed by sub-sea permafrost layers, hydrates deposits are located. This would mean that when the warming potentially talik or pingo-like features within the shelf, they would also serve as gas migration pathways for the formerly frozen methane, and a lot of attention has been paid to that possibility. Shakhova et al. (2008) estimate that not less than 1,400 gigatonnes of carbon is presently locked up as methane and methane hydrates under the Arctic submarine permafrost, and 5–10% of that area is subject to puncturing by open talik. Their paper initially included the line that the "release of up to 50 gigatonnes of predicted amount of hydrate storage [is] highly possible for abrupt release at any time".

This is what led to the original Clathrate gun hypothesis, and in 2008 the United States Department of Energy National Laboratory system and the United States Geological Survey's Climate Change Science Program both identified potential clathrate destabilization in the Arctic as one of four most serious scenarios for abrupt climate change, which have been singled out for priority research. The USCCSP released a report in late December 2008 estimating the gravity of this risk. A 2012 study of the effects for the original hypothesis, based on a coupled climate–carbon cycle model (GCM) assessed a 1000-fold (from <1 to 1000 ppmv) methane increase—within a single pulse, from methane hydrates (based on carbon amount estimates for the PETM, with ~2000 GtC), and concluded it would increase atmospheric temperatures by more than 6 °C within 80 years. Further, carbon stored in the land biosphere would decrease by less than 25%, suggesting a critical situation for ecosystems and farming, especially in the tropics. Another 2012 assessment of the literature identifies methane hydrates on the Shelf of East Arctic Seas as a potential trigger.

A risk of seismic activity being potentially responsible for mass methane releases has been considered as well. In 2012, seismic observations destabilizing methane hydrate along the continental slope of the eastern United States, following the intrusion of warmer ocean currents, suggests that underwater landslides could release methane. The estimated amount of methane hydrate in this slope is 2.5 gigatonnes (about 0.2% of the amount required to cause the PETM), and it is unclear if the methane could reach the atmosphere. However, the authors of the study caution: "It is unlikely that the western North Atlantic margin is the only area experiencing changing ocean currents; our estimate of 2.5 gigatonnes of destabilizing methane hydrate may therefore represent only a fraction of the methane hydrate currently destabilizing globally." Bill McGuire notes, "There may be a threat of submarine landslides around the margins of Greenland, which are less well explored. Greenland is already uplifting, reducing the pressure on the crust beneath and also on submarine methane hydrates in the sediment around its margins, and increased seismic activity may be apparent within decades as active faults beneath the ice sheet are unloaded. This could provide the potential for the earthquake or methane hydrate destabilisation of submarine sediment, leading to the formation of submarine slides and, perhaps, tsunamis in the North Atlantic."

Observed emissions

East Siberian Arctic Shelf 
Research carried out in 2008 in the Siberian Arctic showed methane releases on the annual scale of millions of tonnes, which was a substantial increase on the previous estimate of 0.5 millions of tonnes per year.  apparently through perforations in the seabed permafrost, with concentrations in some regions reaching up to 100 times normal levels. The excess methane has been detected in localized hotspots in the outfall of the Lena River and the border between the Laptev Sea and the East Siberian Sea. At the time, some of the melting was thought to be the result of geological heating, but more thawing was believed to be due to the greatly increased volumes of meltwater being discharged from the Siberian rivers flowing north. 

By 2013, the same team of researchers used multiple sonar observations to quantify the density of bubbles emanating from subsea permafrost into the ocean (a process called ebullition), and found that 100–630 mg methane per square meter is emitted daily along the East Siberian Arctic Shelf (ESAS), into the water column. They also found that during storms, when wind accelerates air-sea gas exchange, methane levels in the water column drop dramatically. Observations suggest that methane release from seabed permafrost will progress slowly, rather than abruptly. However, Arctic cyclones, fueled by global warming, and further accumulation of greenhouse gases in the atmosphere could contribute to more rapid methane release from this source. Altogether, their updated estimate had now amounted to 17 millions of tonnes per year. 

However, these findings were soon questioned, as this rate of annual release would mean that the ESAS alone would account for between 28% and 75% of the observed Arctic methane emissions, which contradicts many other studies. In January 2020, it was found that the rate at which methane enters the atmosphere after it had been released from the shelf deposits into the water column had been greatly overestimated, and observations of atmospheric methane fluxes taken from multiple ship cruises in the Arctic instead indicate that only around 3.02 million tonnes of methane are emitted annually from the ESAS. A modelling study published in 2020 suggested that under the present-day conditions, annual methane release from the ESAS may be as low as 1000 tonnes, with 2.6 – 4.5 million tonnes representing the peak potential of turbulent emissions from the shelf.

Beaufort Sea continental slope 

A radiocarbon dating study in 2018 found that after the 30-meter isobath, only around 10% of the methane in surface waters can be attributed to ancient permafrost or methane hydrates. The authors suggested that even a significantly accelerated methane release would still largely fail to reach the atmosphere.

Svalbard 
Hong et al. 2017 studied methane seepage in the shallow arctic seas at the Barents Sea close to Svalbard. Temperature at the seabed has fluctuated seasonally over the last century, between -1.8 and 4.8 °C, it has only affected release of methane to a depth of about 1.6 meters at the sediment-water interface. Hydrates can be stable through the top 60 meters of the sediments and the current observed releases originate from deeper below the sea floor. They conclude that the increased methane flux started hundreds to thousands of years ago, noted about it, "..episodic ventilation of deep reservoirs rather than warming-induced gas hydrate dissociation." Summarizing his research, Hong stated:

Research by Klaus Wallmann et al. 2018 concluded that hydrate dissociation at Svalbard 8,000 years ago was due to isostatic rebound (continental uplift following deglaciation). As a result, the water depth got shallower with less hydrostatic pressure, without further warming. The study, also found that today's deposits at the site become unstable at a depth of ~ 400 meters, due to seasonal bottom water warming, and it remains unclear if this is due to natural variability or anthropogenic warming. Moreover, another paper published in 2017 found that only 0.07% of the methane released from the gas hydrate dissociation at Svalbard appears to reach the atmosphere, and usually only when the wind speeds were low.  In 2020, a subsequent study confirmed that only a small fraction of methane from the Svalbard seeps reaches the atmosphere, and that the wind speed holds a greater influence on the rate of release than dissolved methane concentration on site. 

Finally, a paper published in 2017 indicated that the methane emissions from at least one seep field at Svalbard were more than compensated for by the enhanced carbon dioxide uptake due to the greatly increased phytoplankton activity in this nutrient-rich water. The daily amount of carbon dioxide absorbed by the phytoplankton was 1,900 greater than the amount of methane emitted, and the negative (i.e. indirectly cooling) radiative forcing from the CO2 uptake was up to 251 times greater than the warming from the methane release.

Current outlook 
In 2014 based on their research on the northern United States Atlantic marine continental margins from Cape Hatteras to Georges Bank, a group of scientists from the US Geological Survey, the Department of Geosciences, Mississippi State University, Department of Geological Sciences, Brown University and Earth Resources Technology, found widespread leakage of methane from the seafloor, but they did not assign specific dates, beyond suggesting that some of the seeps were more than 1000 years old. In March 2017, a meta-analysis by the USGS Gas Hydrates Project concluded:
 In June 2017, scientists from the Center for Arctic Gas Hydrate (CAGE), Environment and Climate at the University of Tromsø, published a study describing over a hundred ocean sediment craters, some 300 meters wide and up to 30 meters deep, formed due to explosive eruptions, attributed to destabilizing methane hydrates, following ice-sheet retreat during the last glacial period, around 15,000 years ago, a few centuries after the Bølling-Allerød warming. These areas around the Barents Sea, still seep methane today, and still existing bulges with methane reservoirs could eventually have the same fate. Later that same year, the Arctic Council published SWIPA 2017 report, where it cautioned "Arctic sources and sinks of greenhouse gases are still hampered by data and knowledge gaps." 

In 2018, a perspective piece devoted to tipping points in the climate system suggested that the climate change contribution from methane hydrates would be "negligible" by the end of the century, but could amount to 0.4-0.5 degrees Celsius on the millennial timescales. In 2021, the IPCC Sixth Assessment Report no longer included methane hydrates in the list of potential tipping points, and says that "it is very unlikely that CH4 emissions from clathrates will substantially warm the climate system over the next few centuries." The report had also linked terrestrial hydrate deposites to gas emission craters discovered in the Yamal Peninsula in Siberia, Russia beginning in July 2014, but noted that since terrestrial gas hydrates predominantly form at a depth below 200 metres, a substantial response within the next few centuries can be ruled out. Likewise, a 2022 assessment of tipping points described methane hydrates as a "threshold-free feedback" rather than a tipping point.

In fiction
The science fiction novel Mother of Storms by John Barnes offers a fictional example of catastrophic climate change caused by methane clathrate release.
In The Life Lottery by Ian Irvine unprecedented seismic activity triggers a release of methane hydrate, reversing global cooling.
The hypothesis is the basis of an experiment in the PlayStation 2 game Death By Degrees.
In Transcendent by Stephen Baxter, averting such a crisis is a major plotline.
The novel The Black Silent by author David Dun features this idea as a key scientific point.
In the anime Ergo Proxy, a string of explosions in the methane hydrate reserves wipes out 85% of species on Earth.
The novel The Far Shore of Time by Frederik Pohl features an alien race attempting to destroy humanity by bombing the methane clathrate reserves, thus releasing the gas into the atmosphere.
The novel The Swarm by Frank Schätzing features what first appear to be freak events related to the world's oceans.
In Charles Stross' Laundry Files universe, an intentionally triggered clathrate gun scenario is viewed as a possible retaliatory strategy that could be utilized by Blue Hades in response to terminal violation of the Benthic Treaty.

See also

 Atlantic meridional overturning circulation
Azolla event
Clathrate compound
 Effects of climate change
 Extinction event
Limnic eruption
Methane chimney
Ocean acidification
Storegga Slide

References

Further reading

 , cited by 21 other articles.

External links

 

 
Methane: A Scientific Journey from Obscurity to Climate Super-Stardom Good Sept. 2004 background report from NASA GISS
Wakening the Kraken

History of climate variability and change
Permian–Triassic extinction event
Clathrates
Meteorological hypotheses